Deschambault-Grondines is a municipality of about 2100 inhabitants in the Canadian province of Quebec, located in Portneuf Regional County Municipality. The municipality was incorporated in 2002 by the merger of the formerly independent villages of Deschambault and Grondines.

The name Grondines was named by Samuel de Champlain himself. "Grondines" is from the French verb "gronder", meaning to rumble or roar. In 1674, The Grondines windmill was built and is the oldest windmill in Québec. 

The windmill was first a flour mill, and then a lighthouse. In 1842 the church Saint-Charles-Borromée was built in Grondines. In 2006 the local Fromagerie des Grondines was built, it is an organic cheese farm open to the public.

Some of the famous people who lived here include filmmaker Denys Arcand, who was born in Deschambault.

Seigneurie des Grondines

The 'seigneurie des Grondines' was one of the oldest lordship in the province of Quebec, and was initially granted in 1637 by the Company of New France to Duchess Marie-Madeleine de Vignerot de Pontcourlay, niece of Cardinal Richelieu, chief minister of Louis XIV. 

The estate covered a land area of around 90 square miles or nearly 60,000 acres. In 1646, the Governor of New-France at the time, Charles Jacques Huault de Montmagny, gave the concession to the nuns hospitallers, administrators of Hôtel-Dieu de Québec, and thereafter, it was resold in 1683 to Lord Jacques Aubert. Being the father-in-law of Louis Hamelin, the next lord of Grondines, the lordship passed to the Hamelin family afterwards, and was transmitted to their descendants until 1797, following the British Conquest. This family was one of the eight seigneurial dynasties that lived permanently on their estate for six generations.

Over time, the Hamelins married members of the French-Canadian nobility. The families were the Couillard de l'Espinay, the Denys de la Ronde, partners of Charles Aubert de La Chesnaye, the Fleury d'Eschambault, the Gaultier de Varennes, the Lorimier de la Rivière, the Chavigny de la Chevrotière, and their in-laws included the Barons Le Moyne de Longueuil, the Pézard de Champlain, and the Boucher de Montarville.

A member of this family was also recognized as noble by the Sovereign Council of New France of Louis XIV in 1654, and would join the French-Canadian nobility, being the lord and commander Jacques-François Hamelin de Bourgchemin et de l'Hermitière, a descendant of Jacques Hamelin, bishop of Tulle. In 1766, a member of the Hamelin de Chavigny also appeared in documents of the canadian nobility, where they asked the king to keep in power the current Governor of Quebec James Murray, with the hope of being less penalized by the injustices they had to suffer after the British conquest. 

The signatories, including A. Hamelin, were Luc de la Corne, François-Joseph Cugnet, Aubert de Gaspé, Antoine Juchereau Duchesnay, and a few others. The last lord of Grondines was Senator David Edward Price in 1871, a member of the influential Price family.

Demographics
Population trend:
 Population in 2011: 2131 (2006 to 2011 population change: 4.9%)
 Population in 2006: 2032
 Population total in 2001: 1965
 Deschambault: 1263
 Grondines: 702
 Population in 1996:
 Deschambault: 1240
 Grondines: 718
 Population in 1991:
 Deschambault: 1213
 Grondines: 654

Private dwellings occupied by usual residents: 951 (total dwellings: 1043)

Mother tongue:
 English as first language: 0%
 French as first language: 98.8%
 English and French as first language: 0%
 Other as first language: 1.2%

Points of interest
 Saint-Joseph of Deschambault church, classed historical monument in 1964.
 The old presbytery of Deschambault, classed historical monument in 1965.
 The old mill of Grondines, classed archaeological monument in 1984.
 The church of Saint-Charles-Borromée in Grondines.
 Presbytery of Grondines, classed historical monument in 1966.
 House of the Grolo widow, classed historical monument in 1971.
 House of Delisle, classed historical monument in 1963.
 House of F.-R.-Neilson-Sewell, classed historical monument in 1978.
 The old Chevrotière Mill, classed historical monument in 1976.

Climate

Miscellaneous
The patron saint of Deschambault-Grondines is Saint Joseph.

References

Further reading
Mariages de Deschambault (comté Portneuf) – 1713–1900, raised by Rosaire Proulx priest, compiled and published by Benoit Pontbriand agronomist, 1966, 213 pages

External links

Municipalities in Quebec
Incorporated places in Capitale-Nationale